Robby Darwis (born 30 October 1964 in Bandung, West Java) is a retired Indonesian football player and coach. He is the current technical director for PSKC Cimahi, and one of Persib Bandung football stars of his generation.

Darwis's position was a stopper. In the first season of Liga Indonesia, as captain he brought Persib to championship. Darwis has also played in Malaysia Super League, at Kelantan FA. For Indonesia national football team, he played for 10 years (1987–1997), with 53 caps and he has scored 6 goals.

Playing career 

Darwis started his career as a teenage at local football club Arjuna and SSB Capella. Initially, he played as a forward or attacking midfielder. He took part in a selection by Persib in 1979 as held by Polish coach Marek Janota where he passed. He was first included in the senior squad in 1983.

In 1989, he was transferred to Malaysian club Kelantan FA. At the club, he was sent off in his debut match against Singapore FA on 11 July 1989 for allegedly kicking the referee. As a result, he was suspended for 3 months, and was unable to represent Indonesia at 1989 Southeast Asian Games. After reviewing, the suspension was lifted and he returned to Persib on 2 December upon being released by Kelantan.

He brought a lot of success to Persib during his time at the club, with 3 Perserikatan titles and the inaugural Liga Indonesia 1994-95. He also played in 1995 Asian Club Championship for Persib. In the first round, Persib defeated Bangkok Bank F.C.  in 2-1 aggregate and Pasay on both second round matches. The team advanced to quarterfinals but finished at the bottom of the East Asia group stage. Later, he would play for Persikab Bandung and retired there.

He was part of Indonesia national football team that won gold medals at 1987 and 1991 SEA Games. He captained the team between 1993 and 1997 and would go on representing the country until 1997 SEA Games which the country hosted and won silver medal.

Player 
 Persib Bandung
 Tempo Utama
 Tunas Inti
 Kelantan FA
 Persikab Bandung
 Persikabo Bogor

Coaching career 
Three years after his retirement, Darwis switched from playing to coaching where he was appointed coach of Pro Duta F.C. In 2007, he rejoined Persib as an assistant to Iurie Arcan, and remained at the club for 5 years. Darwis briefly coached Persib as a caretaker in 2007 and 2008, when Jaya Hartono resigned in 2009–10 season and in 2012 when Drago Mamić was sacked as coach.

He returned to becoming head coach in 2015 when he was recruited by PSB Bogor in Liga Nusantara. Later, he moved to PSKC Cimahi in 2017. He won the team regional West Java 2017 Liga 3 by beating Maung Anom on penalties (3-1) but were eliminated in the National Round group stage. In the following season, the team also repeated the fate, beating Persikab Bandung 2–0. Darwis then took the team to the finals of 2019 Liga 3, but the team lost 3–1 to Persijap Jepara, ensuring the team's first ever promotion to Liga 2 for the first time in its history.

Personal life 
Darwis works at BNI as a banker since he retired playing professionally. He is famous for his quote "halik ku aing!"  that roughly translates to "move away, let me do this!" during his time playing for Persib, and his squad number 6 at the club. He occasionally plays for Persib Legends in charity exhibition matches.

Honours

Player 
Persib Bandung

 Perserikatan (3): 1986, 1989/90, 1993/94
 Premier Division (1): 1994–95
 Sultan Hassanal Bolkiah Cup (1): 1986

Indonesia

 Southeast Asian Games  Gold medal (2): 1987, 1991

Coach 
PSKC Cimahi

 Liga 3 (runner-up) : 2019
 West Java round Liga 3 (3) : 2017, 2018, 2019

Individual
 IFFHS Men’s All Time Indonesia Dream Team: 2022'''

External links 

 Profile on Persib official site

References 

Living people
1964 births
Indonesian footballers
Indonesian expatriate footballers
Indonesia international footballers
Persib Bandung players
Persib Bandung managers
Sportspeople from Bandung
Footballers at the 1986 Asian Games
Indonesian Super League-winning players
Southeast Asian Games gold medalists for Indonesia
Southeast Asian Games medalists in football
Association football defenders
Competitors at the 1987 Southeast Asian Games
Asian Games competitors for Indonesia
Indonesian football managers